"Hip Hip Hooray" is the first single by Australian dance group Sneaky Sound System, it was released on 15 November 2004 well ahead of their self-titled debut studio album, Sneaky Sound System (August 2006). Founding mainstay, Black Angus (Angus McDonald) wrote the track, and contributed guitar, keyboards, bass guitar, drums and lead vocals. It appeared on the ARIA Singles Chart Top 100.

Track listing

Personnel 
 Black Angus – bass, drums, guitars, keys, mixed by, producer, rework by (track 3), vocals, writer
 Miss Annie – backup vocals
 Pip Edwards – backup vocals
 Michael K – Design
 Ken Cloud – additional production (track 2)
 Dolso – bass, drums, engineer, guitars, keys, mixed by, producer, rework by (track 3)
 MC Double D – backup vocals
 Pocket – additional production (track 2)

Charts

Release history

References

External links
"Hip Hip Hooray" CD single on Waterfront Records

Sneaky Sound System songs
2004 debut singles
2004 songs